The 1963 All-Atlantic Coast Conference football team consists of American football players chosen by various selectors for their All-Atlantic Coast Conference ("ACC") teams for the 1963 NCAA University Division football season. Selectors in 1963 included the Associated Press (AP) and the United Press International (UPI).  Players who were the consensus first-team selections of both the AP and UPI are displayed in bold.

All-Atlantic Coast selections

Ends
 Bob Lacey, North Carolina (AP-1)
 Don Montgomery, North Carolina State (AP-1)

Tackles
 Bert Wilder, North Carolina State (AP-1)
 Chuck Walker, Duke (AP-1)

Guards
 Turnley Todd, Virginia (AP-1)
 Tom Gibson, South Carolina (AP-1)

Centers
 Ted Bunton, Clemson (AP-1)
 Chris Hanburger, North Carolina (AP-2) (Pro Football Hall of Fame)

Backs
 Jim Rossi, North Carolina State (AP-1 [quarterback])
 Jay Wilkinson, Duke (AP-1 [halfback])
 Ken Willard, North Carolina (AP-1 [halfback])
 Pat Crain, Clemson (AP-1 [fullback])
 Dick Shiner, Maryland (AP-2)

Key
AP = Associated Press

UPI = United Press International

See also
1963 College Football All-America Team

References

All-Atlantic Coast Conference football team
All-Atlantic Coast Conference football teams